KWAD (920 AM, "Classic Hit Country") is a radio station broadcasting a classic country music format. Licensed to Wadena, Minnesota, United States, the station serves the Wadena area. The station is owned by Hubbard Broadcasting, Inc. (through licensee HBI Radio Brainerd/Wadena, LLC) and features programming from Westwood One.

Hubbard Broadcasting announced on November 13, 2014, that it would purchase the Omni Broadcasting stations, including KWAD. The sale was completed on February 27, 2015, at a purchase price of $8 million for the 16 stations and one translator.

References

External links
 

Radio stations in Minnesota
Classic country radio stations in the United States
Wadena County, Minnesota
Hubbard Broadcasting
Radio stations established in 1949
1949 establishments in Minnesota